The French Confederation of Management – General Confederation of Executives (CFE-CGC) is one of the five major French confederations of trade unions.

It only organizes unions for professional employees, with higher education and/or in management or executive positions. It originated from several former unions of engineers in 1945. Its leader is François Hommeril.

Professional Elections

The CFE-CGC won 8.19% of the vote in the employee's college during the 2008 professional elections, its best result to date. It had won 7.01% in 2002.

Affiliates
The following federations and unions are affiliated:

Federation of the food industry (CFE-CGC Agro)
Federation of Water and Sanitation (FDEA CFE-CGC)
Insurance Federation
Federation of Chemistry
Constructio federation
Federation of Culture, Communication and Entertainment (FCCS CFE-CGC)
Federation of Sales Forces (CSN CFE-CGC)
Federation of air trades (FNEMA CFE-CGC)
Federation of finance and banking professions (SNB Services)
Federation of Public Services (CFE-CGC FP)
Transport Federation
Federation of Commerce and Services (FNECS CFE-CGC
Federation of Mines Supervision (FNEM CFE-CGC)
Energy Federation CFE-CGC
Federation enermine
Media Federation 2000 (CFE-CGC Media)
Metallurgy Federation
National Federation CFE-CGC of ports and chambers of commerce and industry (SNECA)
National Federation of Hotel, Catering and Sports (CFE-CGC INOVA)
National Federation of Management Staff of IT Service Companies (FIECI)
National union CFE-CGC of executives in the service of employment (CFE-CGC Apec)
Union social protection health CFE-CGC (UP2S health)
Union social protection health CFE-CGC (UP2S social security)
Union for social health protection of Provident and Supplementary Retirement Institutions and Schemes (UP2S IPRC)
Territorial union CFE-CGC of New Caledonia
Local union (UL)
The departmental union (UD)
The regional union (UR)
The Confederation

Presidents
1944: Jean Ducros
1956: André Malterre
1975: Yvan Charpentié
1979: Jean Menu
1984: Paul Marchelli
1993: Marc Vilbenoît
1999: Jean-Luc Cazettes
2005: Bernard Van Craeynest
2013: Carole Couvert
2016: François Hommeril

Trade unions in France
Trade Union Advisory Committee to the OECD
National trade union centers of France
Trade unions established in 1944